The 2019 Foxwoods Resort Casino 301 is a Monster Energy NASCAR Cup Series race held on July 21, 2019 at New Hampshire Motor Speedway in Loudon, New Hampshire. Contested over 301 laps on the  speedway, it was the 20th race of the 2019 Monster Energy NASCAR Cup Series season.

Report

Background

New Hampshire Motor Speedway is a  oval speedway located in Loudon, New Hampshire, which has hosted NASCAR racing annually since the early 1990s, as well as the longest-running motorcycle race in North America, the Loudon Classic. Nicknamed "The Magic Mile", the speedway is often converted into a  road course, which includes much of the oval.

The track was originally the site of Bryar Motorsports Park before being purchased and redeveloped by Bob Bahre. The track is currently one of eight major NASCAR tracks owned and operated by Speedway Motorsports.

Entry list
 (i) denotes driver who are ineligible for series driver points.
 (R) denotes rookie driver.

First practice

Qualifying

Qualifying results

Practice (post-qualifying)

Second practice

Final practice

Race

Stage results

Stage One
Laps: 75

Stage Two
Laps: 75

Final stage results

Stage Three
Laps: 151

Race statistics
 Lead changes: 14 among 7 different drivers
 Cautions/Laps: 9 for 48
 Red flags: 0
 Time of race: 3 hours, 3 minutes and 37 seconds
 Average speed:

Media

Television
NBC Sports covered the race on the television side. Rick Allen, four-time and all-time Loudon winner Jeff Burton, Steve Letarte and Dale Earnhardt Jr. called the action in the booth for the race. Dave Burns, Marty Snider and Kelli Stavast reported from pit lane during the race.

Radio
PRN had the radio call for the race, which was simulcast on Sirius XM NASCAR Radio. Doug Rice, Mark Garrow, and Wendy Venturini called the race from the booth when the field raced down the frontstretch. Rob Albright called the race from turns 1 & 2 and Pat Patterson called the race from turns 3 & 4. Brad Gillie, Steve Richards, Jim Noble, and Brett McMillan handled the duties on pit lane.

Standings after the race

Drivers' Championship standings

Manufacturers' Championship standings

Note: Only the first 16 positions are included for the driver standings.
. – Driver has clinched a position in the Monster Energy NASCAR Cup Series playoffs.

References

2019 Foxwoods Resort Casino 301
2019 Monster Energy NASCAR Cup Series
2019 in sports in New Hampshire
July 2019 sports events in the United States